The 1836 United States presidential election in Massachusetts took place between November 3 and December 7, 1836, as part of the 1836 United States presidential election. Voters chose 14 representatives, or electors to the Electoral College, who voted for President and Vice President.

Massachusetts voted for Whig candidate and state native Daniel Webster over the Democratic candidate, Martin Van Buren. Webster won Massachusetts by a margin of 10.32%.

In a unique strategy to throw the election into the house of representatives, the Whigs ran four different candidates in different sections of the United States. This is the only state in which Daniel Webster was on the ballot.

Results

See also
 United States presidential elections in Massachusetts

References

Massachusetts
1836
1836 Massachusetts elections